Mérigny is a commune in the Indre department in central France.

Geography
The commune is located in the parc naturel régional de la Brenne.

The Anglin flows northwest through the middle of the commune, then forms its northwestern border.

Population

See also
Communes of the Indre department
Plaincourault Chapel

References

Communes of Indre